Gephyramoeba is a genus of heterotrophic amoebae, morphologically similar to genera Rhizamoeba and Leptomyxa, although it is not genetically related to either of these genera.

It has been suggested that "Gephyramoeba sp." ATCC 50654 is not truly Gephyramoeba.

References

External links
Gephyramoeba on PubMed

Amoebozoa genera